Chrysis comparata is a species of cuckoo wasps (insects in the family Chrysididae).

Subspecies
 Chrysis comparata comparata Lepeletier, 1806 
 Chrysis comparata orientica Linsenmaier, 1959

Description
Head and thorax are bluish green. Eyes and antennae are black. The abdomen is golden red, while the basis of the first segment is bluish green. Wings are smoked. The pronotum may be longer than the scutellum.

Biology
These wasps mainly parasitize hymenoptera belonging to the species Pemphredon unicolor, Hylaeus confusus, Paranthidiellum lituratum and Anthidium manicatum.

Distribution
This species can be found in Europe and in the Near East.

References

External links
 Barry.exp-host

Insects described in 1806
Chrysidinae
Hymenoptera of Europe
Taxa named by Amédée Louis Michel le Peletier